Baro Shona Masjid  (English: The Great Golden Mosque) also known as  Baroduari Masjid (12-gate mosque),  is located in Gour, West Bengal, India. Completed in 1526, it is situated half a kilometer to the south of Ramkeli, 12 km south from the city of Malda. The mosque with its ruins can be found very close to the India-Bangladesh border.  With a gigantic rectangular structure of brick and stone, this mosque is the largest monument in Gour. Though the name means Twelve Doors, this monument actually has eleven.

According to the List of Monuments of National Importance in West Bengal (serial no. N-WB-83) Baro Shona Masjid is an ASI listed monument.

History
Mosque is a Holy place for Muslims. It refers to its Arabic name – Masjid. A Mosque is a place for worship for all the followers of Islam. Mosques all around the world are well known for the general importance to Muslims as well as for Islamic architecture and representation of Islamic culture. Although Mosque is the place where all the Muslims of the community come together and have their prayers, the Mosque can also be the place of beautiful architecture that is famous all around the world.

The construction of Baro Shona Masjid, measuring 50.4 m by 22.8 m, and 12 m. in height, was started by the Sultan of Bengal Alauddin Husain Shah and was completed in 1526 AD by his son Nasiruddin Nasrat Shah. The Indo-Arabic style of architecture and the ornamental stone carvings make Baroduari a special attraction for tourists.

Design
The mosque is composed of eleven entrances, two buttresses, four corner towers and a spacious courtyard which is almost seventy meters in diameter. The building is faced in plain stone and the doors would originally have been framed by mosaics of glazed colored tiles in floral patterns. The roof was strewn with 44 hemispherical domes, of which 11 on the corridor still remain. These domes were originally gilded, and, hence, gave the mosque its name. From the interior, these domes are arcaded, half in brick and half in stone.

It is the largest building still standing in Gaur. This very ancient mosque is also known as Qutub Shahi Mosque. It was built in the honour of saint Nur Qutub-e-Alam, son of Saint Makhdoom Alaul Haque Pandvi, by Makhdum Shaikh, the descendant and fellow of the saint. The mosque was known as Sona Masjid due to its earlier gilded wall surface and crowns of the turrets.

The eleven arched entrances of the east façade open into a long domed verandah formed by wide piers on the east and west sides. The verandah in turn, opens onto a prayer chamber composed of three aisles with eleven bays each.

Like the verandah, the prayer chambers, now in ruins was entirely covered with pendentives. In the northwestern corner of the mosque. Traces remain on a large Takht, the mosque is stoned faced, but unlike the earlier stoned faced Choto Sona mosque, the surface is not carved to imitate brickwork, the only ornamentation is a string coursing running across the structure at half its height, majestic and somber, the ornamentation on the aro Shona Masjid stands in contrast to the ornamentally carved brick Jami mosque at Begha, built only three years earlier by the same Sultan. This difference in styles raises interesting questions regarding the sultan's role in the appearance of the architecture he commissioned.

Ornamentation
Great golden mosque which is the largest of all the monuments in gaur, having an open square in front of 200 feet diameter, with handsome arched gateways in the middle of three of its sides the sanctuary, a rectangular structure of brick faced with stone is 168 feet long by 76 feet wide, its parapet 20 feet high forming a long shallow curve below which is spaced a series of eleven pointed arches between the octagonal turrets at the angles, its interior contains impressive aisles of arches carried in front of the western wall within which is a mihrab opposite each bay.

Notes

References

 Husain, A. B. (2007). Architecture – A History Through Ages. Dhaka: Asiatic Society of Bangladesh, p. 117 , .
 Abu Sayeed, M. Ahmed (2006) Mosque Architecture in Bangladesh. UNESCO Dhaka. p. 102 . 
 The Islamic heritage of Bengal (1984) UNESCO, p. 69 .

Mosques in West Bengal
Monuments of National Importance in West Bengal
Tourist attractions in Malda district
Religious buildings and structures completed in 1526
16th-century mosques
1526 establishments in India
Maldah
Bengal Sultanate mosques